Abul Hossain, ndc, psc, is a retired three-star rank Bangladesh Army officer. He was a lieutenant general. He served as the director general of Border Guards Bangladesh. Before that he served as military secretary to President Md Abdul Hamid and as Engineer-in-chief at Army Headquarters, Commandant of Military Institute of Science and Technology, Chief Engineer of Dhaka City Corporation, Director of Special Works Organization and Director of Works & Chief Engineer of the Bangladesh Army. He was also ex-officio Chairman of Shimanto Bank which is a sister concern of BGB Welfare Trust.

Education 
Major General Abul Hossain joined Bangladesh Military Academy on 1 February 1980 and was commissioned on 27 December 1981 in the Corps of Engineers of Bangladesh Army. BSc in civil engineering from the Bangladesh University of Engineering and Technology (BUET). He obtained a Master of Business Administration (MBA) from American International University-Bangladesh and Masters in Defence Studies (MDS) from Bangladesh National University. He is qualified in M Phil Part-I from Bangladesh University of Professionals (BUP). He has undergone many military courses both at home and in abroad; notable ones are Junior Officer Combat Engineering course in China, Battalion Commander Command Course in Turkey, International Border Security & Management Briefing Programmed Course in UK and Advance Security Cooperation 08-1 Execution Course in Asia-Pacific Center for Security Studies (APCSS). He is a graduate of the Defence Service Command and Staff College and the National Defence College at Mirpur Cantonment. He has number of publications in his credit, notable one is "Carbon Mitigation: Clean Coal Through carbon capture & storage under clean development mechanism for energy and climate security in Bangladesh".

Military career 
Hossain served in different engineer battalions. He served as Officer Commanding of 33 Field Company Engineers and Project Officer of Road construction Project at Chimbuk-Thanchi road in Chittagong Hill Tracts. He was Brigade Major of an Independent Engineer Brigade and Grade2 Staff officer of Engineer in Chief Branch at Army Headquarters. He was also Sector Commander of Border Guard Bangladesh. He was chief instructor in Engineer Centre & School of Military Engineering. He was the Director of Special Works Organization and Director Works and Chief Engineer of Army Headquarters. He also served as Commanding Officer of ECSME Training Battalion and Commanding officer of 17 Engineer Construction Battalion. He has done his UN mission as commanding officer of EOD Battalion in Kuwait (OKP-11) at the year of 2000–02. He was Chief Engineer of Dhaka City Corporation and Commandant of Bangladesh Ordnance Factory. He was also the Commandant of Military Institute of Science and Technology. He also served as Engineer in Chief at Army Headquarters.

He joined Bangabhaban as military secretary to President Md Abdul Hamid in January 2014. He was appointed as director general of the Border Guard Bangladesh on 2 November 2016. On 8 March 2018, he was brought back to the army and on 14th March he went to retirement. He elevated to Lt. General from Major General rank on the last day of his service.

UN Mission 
He served in the United Nations Iraq–Kuwait Observation Mission. From 2000 to 2002 he commanded 17 Engineer Construction Battalion and Explosive Ordnance Disposal Battalion in Kuwait (OKP-11).

References 

Living people
Bangladesh Army generals
Bangladesh University of Engineering and Technology alumni
1962 births
Director Generals of Border Guards Bangladesh
American International University-Bangladesh alumni
Engineers in Chief of the Bangladesh Army